Coleophora scioleuca is a moth of the family Coleophoridae. It is found in Yunnan in southern China and in Nepal.

References

scioleuca
Moths of Asia
Moths described in 1938